Zhongmu County (postal: Chungmow) is a county of Henan Province, South Central China, it is under the administration of the prefecture-level city of Zhengzhou, the capital of Henan. Located in the north-central part of the province, it is the easternmost county-level division of Zhengzhou.

The Battle of Guandu took place in 200 CE in the northeast of Zhongmu County.

Administrative divisions
As 2012, this county is divided to 2 subdistricts, 15 towns and 1 township.
Subdistricts
Qingnianlu Subdistrict
Dongfenglu Subdistrict

Towns

Townships
Diaojia Township

Climate

Transportation
China National Highway 220

References

External links
Official website of Zhongmu County Government

 
County-level divisions of Henan
Zhengzhou